Union Township is one of the twelve townships of Van Wert County, Ohio, United States.  The 2000 census found 1,009 people in the township, 805 of whom lived in the unincorporated portions of the township.

Geography
Located in the northern part of the county, it borders the following townships:
Blue Creek Township, Paulding County - north
Latty Township, Paulding County - northeast corner
Hoaglin Township - east
Ridge Township - southeast corner
Pleasant Township - south
Harrison Township - southwest corner
Tully Township - west
Benton Township, Paulding County - northwest corner

Part of the village of Scott is located in northwestern Union Township, along the border with Paulding County.

Name and history
It is one of twenty-seven Union Townships statewide.

Government
The township is governed by a three-member board of trustees, who are elected in November of odd-numbered years to a four-year term beginning on the following January 1. Two are elected in the year after the presidential election and one is elected in the year before it. There is also an elected township fiscal officer, who serves a four-year term beginning on April 1 of the year after the election, which is held in November of the year before the presidential election. Vacancies in the fiscal officership or on the board of trustees are filled by the remaining trustees.

References

External links
County website

Townships in Van Wert County, Ohio
Townships in Ohio